Barry Dignam (born 31 March 1971) is an Irish filmmaker.  Some of his films are Chicken, Dream Kitchen, Stages, Bounce and A Ferret Called Mickey.

Career
Barry Dignam studied drama at Trinity College, Dublin and Film at the National Film School of Ireland (IADT). He has made a number of internationally successful shorts including Chicken, Dream Kitchen and A Ferret Called Mickey. His films have been presented in official selection at over a hundred and fifty international film festivals and have won numerous awards. He has been nominated for a Palme d'Or at Cannes and a Berlin Bear. Dignam's work has been screened by top broadcasters including Film Four, PBS, Canal+ and have been released on DVD and theatrically in both Europe and the US.

Dignam lectures in screenwriting and direction at the National Film School at IADT Dún Laoghaire.

Personal life
Dignam and his partner, Hugh Walsh, are one of the first couples to enter into civil partnership in Ireland, and the first to do so after the mandatory three-month wait (six previous couples were granted exemptions on compassionate grounds).

References

Irish film directors
1971 births
Living people
Alumni of IADT